France executed nuclear weapons tests in the areas of Reggane and In Ekker in Algeria and the Mururoa and Fangataufa Atolls in French Polynesia, from 13 February 1960 through 27 January 1996.  These totaled 210 tests with 210 device explosions, 50 in the atmosphere.

List

See also
 List of nuclear weapons tests
 Force de dissuasion

References

Sources

 
 
 

Nuclear technology-related lists